John Rae  (24 August 1904 – 2 December 1979) was a New Zealand politician of the National Party.

Biography

He was born in Auckland on either 4 or 24 August 1904, a son of Annie and Charles Edward Rae. He attended the University of Auckland and became an accountant.

He represented the Roskill electorate from 1949 to 1957, when he was defeated by Arthur Faulkner; and then the Eden electorate from 1960 to 1972, when he retired.

He was a Minister of Housing under Keith Holyoake in 1957 and from 1960 to 1972.

In the 1977 New Year Honours, Rae was appointed an Officer of the Order of the British Empire, for public services.

Rae died on 2 December 1979, and he was cremated at Purewa Crematorium, Auckland.

Notes

References

Who's Who in New Zealand (10th edition, 1971)

1904 births
1979 deaths
New Zealand National Party MPs
Members of the Cabinet of New Zealand
Members of the New Zealand House of Representatives
New Zealand MPs for Auckland electorates
Unsuccessful candidates in the 1957 New Zealand general election
New Zealand Officers of the Order of the British Empire